The following is a list of notable machinima-related events in the year 2004.

Events
March 11 – The ILL Clan co-hosted the Florida Film Festival using their characters Lenny and Larry Lumberjack.
March 16 – Epic Games released its first-person shooter (FPS) computer game Unreal Tournament 2004.
November 9 – Bungie released its FPS video game Halo 2, which is used in multiple machinima series.
November 16 – Valve released its FPS computer game Half-Life 2.

Notable releases
January 3 –  of Rooster Teeth Productions' Red vs. Blue began with the premiere of episode 20 at the Lincoln Center for the Performing Arts.
July 11 – Season 2 of Red vs. Blue ended with episode 38.
October 18 – Rooster Teeth Productions released the first episode of its new series, The Strangerhood.
November 28 – GW Films and Chipmunk Ninjas collaborated to make the popular film ClanWars.

Active series

Fire Team Charlie (2003–2005)
Decisive Battles (2004)
Lenny & Larry on the Campaign Trail (2004)
Neverending Nights (premiered 2004)
Red vs. Blue (2003–2007)
The Strangerhood (2004–2006)
Time Commanders (2003–2005)

Awards

Rockets on Prisoner
Best Movie: Fire Team Charlie episode 13

Notes

References

 

Machinima
Machinima by year